Anne K. Rasmussen (born 1959) is an American educator and ethnomusicologist. Much of her research focuses on Arab music in the US and Islamic ritual and performance. She has been the director of the William & Mary Middle Eastern Music Ensemble since 1994. Rasmussen was named the William M. and Annie B. Bickers Professor of Middle Eastern Studies in 2014.

Education
Rasmussen received her B.A. from Northwestern University, her M.A. from the University of Denver, and her Ph.D. in ethnomusicology from the University of California, Los Angeles. She studied with A. J. Racy, Timothy Rice, Nazir Jairazbhoy, Gerard Behague, and Scott Marcus.

Career
Rasmussen has written articles appearing in many journals, including Ethnomusicology, Asian Music, Popular Music, American Music, The World of Music, The Garland Encyclopaedia of World Music, and the Harvard Dictionary of Music. She produced four CD recordings documenting immigrant and community music in the United States. She is a former Fulbright senior scholar and served as the First Vice President of the Society for Ethnomusicology.

Rasmussen has been teaching courses in ethnomusicology at The College of William & Mary since 1993, where she also directs with Middle Eastern Music Ensemble.

Rasmussen accompanied Indonesian Qur'an reciter Maria Ulfah during the latter's 1999 tour of the United States under the auspices of the Middle East Studies Association of North America. In 2010 and 2011, she was hosted by the government of Oman and the Sultan Qaboos Cultural Center for her musicology research there.

Awards
In 2002, Rasmussen won the Jaap Kunst Prize for her work "The Qur'an in Indonesian Daily Life: The Public Project of Musical Oratory" from the Society for Ethnomusicology. This award is given to the best article published annually in the field of ethnomusicology. The purpose of this prize is "[t]o recognize the most significant article in ethnomusicology written by a member of the Society for Ethnomusicology and published within the previous year (whether in the journal Ethnomusicology or in another journal or edited collection)."

In 2011, her book Women, the Recited Qur’an, and Islamic Music in Indonesia received the Alan Merriam Prize Honorable Mention.
She received the Phi Beta Kappa Award for Excellence in Teaching.

Bibliography
Women, the Recited Qur’an, and Islamic Music in Indonesia (Berkeley : University of California Press, 2010)

References

Ethnomusicologists
Islamic music
University of California, Los Angeles alumni
1959 births
Living people
Northwestern University alumni
University of Denver alumni
American women musicologists
20th-century American musicologists
21st-century American musicologists
College of William & Mary faculty
American women anthropologists